Vepagunta is a suburb in Visakhapatnam city. It comes under Pendurthi revenue division. It has a post office, Pin code is 530047.

Demographics
 India census, Vepagunta had a population of 26,881. Males constitute 51% of the population and females 49%.  Vepagunta has an average literacy rate of 73%, higher than the national average of 59.5%: male literacy is 80%, and female literacy is 67%. In Vepagunta, 10% of the population is under 6 years of age.

Transport
APSRTC routes

References

Towns in Visakhapatnam district
Neighbourhoods in Visakhapatnam